Pan-Andromeda Archaeological Survey (PAndAS) is a large-scale astronomical survey using the Canada-France-Hawaii Telescope.

The survey is exploring the structure and content of the Andromeda Galaxy (M31) and its neighbour, the Triangulum Galaxy (M33). Clues to the formation of these galaxies may lie within the vast space being studied. PAndAS is searching for this history, hence the term "galactic archaeology".

The project is headed by Dr. Alan McConnachie at the Herzberg Institute of Astrophysics (NRC-HIA), and involves over twenty five investigators from that institute, as well as from universities in Canada, France, the United States, the United Kingdom, Germany, and Australia.

See also
Extragalactic astronomy
Observational cosmology
Andromeda XXI
Andromeda XXII

References

Andromeda Galaxy
Astronomical surveys
Observational astronomy
Triangulum Galaxy